Hamida Assil (  20 December 2020), better known as Rukhshana, was an Afghan singer. Referred as one of the first Afghan female singers, she earned her recognition during 1950s and 1970s.

Biography 
Rukhshana (born as Hamida) was born in Kabul, the daughter of Assil Khan Waziri, a four star General in the Afghan Army. She belonged to the Pashtun Wazir tribe. Their family were originally from the southern parts of Afghanistan who later migrated to Kabul.  She is credited with being first Afghan woman to remove the chador to pursue her career. She had performed for royalty, celebrities, and films (e.g. Shah of Iran, Czech Republic, Gandhi, Lance Armstrong).

At the height of her popularity in the 1950s and 1960s, Rukhshana's posters were widely distributed in Kabul, and her photos also graced countless covers of calendars and magazines.  She had a wider fan base over other singers as she was bilingual and could reach a larger segment of Afghan society.  Her music includes songs both in Pashto, her native tongue, and Dari language. She gave an interview with BBC London and allowed her photographs to appear in a newspaper.

She resided in Simi Valley before she died on December 20th, 2020.

References

https://web.archive.org/web/20150418033215/http://www.afghanbuzz.com/articles/read-afghan-female-singers-and-musicians_44.html
http://wn.com/rukhsana_[a_biographical_note]
Baily, John. War, Exile and the Music of Afghanistan: The Ethnographer's Tale (SOAS Musicology Series). 2015. 

Year of birth missing
1940s births
2020 deaths
20th-century Afghan women singers
People from Khost
Musicians from Los Angeles
Afghan emigrants to the United States